Rock um Knuedler is a rock festival held every summer in the centre of Luxembourg City. Founded in 1991 when Luxembourg held the presidency of the European Union, it was originally designed for local groups but since 1995 it has also been a popular venue for foreign bands and artists. Performances by some 12 groups take place each year on two stages erected on Place Guillaume II, also known as Knuedler. Admission is free, attracting audiences of up to 10,000.

Recently, Rock um Knuedler has featured international groups from far afield such as Choc Quib Town (Columbia), Staff Benda Bilili (Democratic Republic of Congo) and Ben Harper and Relentless7 (USA). Many local artists and bands also perform in a programme beginning in the morning and stretching until late in the evening.

External links
Rock um Knuedler website

References

Rock festivals in Luxembourg
Summer events in Luxembourg